Korkino is a town and the administrative center of Korkinsky District in Chelyabinsk Oblast, Russia, located on the eastern slope of the Southern Ural Mountains,  south of Chelyabinsk, the administrative center of the oblast. Population:

History
It was founded as a village of the same name in the second half of the 18th century. It was granted town status on October 2, 1942.

Administrative and municipal status
Within the framework of administrative divisions, Korkino serves as the administrative center of Korkinsky District. As an administrative division, it is, together with two rural localities, incorporated within Korkinsky District as the Town of Korkino. As a municipal division, the Town of Korkino is incorporated within Korkinsky Municipal District as Korkinskoye Urban Settlement.

Economy
Korkino is an important coal-mining center.

Notable people
Mountain climber Anatoli Boukreev was born here in 1958.
Professional hockey player Artemi Panarin was raised by his grandparents in  Korkino from 1992 onward.  He currently plays for the New York Rangers.

References

Notes

Sources

Cities and towns in Chelyabinsk Oblast